Mthembu may refer to:
Gideon Mthembu (born 1963), Swazi sports official and retired runner
Jackson Mthembu (1957–2021), South African politician
Precious Mthembu (born 1984), South African netball player
Ricardo Mthembu (1970–2020), South African politician
Russel Mthembu (born 1947), South African singer
Siphelele Mthembu (born 1987), South African footballer
Thabani Mthembu (born 1994), South African footballer

See also
Mthembu v Letsela, important case in South African customary law, 1996